Steve Dunwell is an American photographer noted for his color photographs of urban and scenic landscapes.

Early life and education

Steve studied photojournalism with Walker Evans at Yale University (BSc 1969).

Photography career 
Steve Dunwell makes photographs of New England – its people, landscape, and industry – for publications, for collectors, and for advertising. Many of his photographs are featured in a series of fourteen picture books on regional subjects, including Extraordinary Boston.

He also works on corporate and editorial assignments, concentrating on industrial environments, architecture, aerials, and portraiture. He has traveled to over 40 nations on 5 continents. His stock photos are represented in several libraries and agencies. Editorial clients include Yankee Magazine, American Style, GEO, American Heritage, Black Enterprise, Preservation Magazine, and National Geographic Traveler.

Steve Dunwell created Back Bay Press in 1994. Back Bay Press specializes in photographic studies of New England subjects. Their most recent title  is Boston Freedom Trail, describing the city's foremost historical venue.

As a supplier of Boston-themed images, Steve continues to make new images of his city, extending and improving his collection. Panoramic and aerial images are a key part of this archive, along with cultural activities.

Steve Dunwell lives and has his studio in the Bay Village neighborhood of Boston. He has been an instructor at New England School of Photography and now teaches workshops at Panasonic Digital Photography Academy. His photographs are included in numerous corporate and private collections.

Books 

 Rhode Island: A Scenic Discovery (Foremost Publishers, 1976)
 The Run of the Mill (Godine Press, 1978)
 Connecticut: A Scenic Discovery (Foremost Publishers, 1980)
 Vision in Steel (AMCA International, 1982)
 Duke University: A Portrait (Fort Church Press, 1983)
 Mystic Seaport (Foremost Publishers, 1984)
 Long Island: A Scenic Discovery (Foremost Publishers, 1985)
 Boston University: Pictorial (Boston University Press, 1989)
 Yale: A Portrait (Fort Church Press, 1990)
 USS Constitution: Old Ironsides (Fort Church Press, 1991)
 Boston Freedom Trail (Back Bay Press, 1996, revised 2004)
 Harvard: A Living Portrait (Back Bay Press, revised 2007)
 Extraordinary Boston (Back Bay Press, revised 2007)
 Massachusetts: A Scenic Discovery (Back Bay Press, revised 2008)

See also
 Aerial photography
 Portrait photography

References
Official website
Panasonic Digital Photo Academy Workshops - Steve Dunwell Biography
Profile of Steve Dunwell (at Massachusetts Bay Trading Company)
TakeGreatPicture.com - Massachusetts Book Review

American photographers
Living people
Yale University alumni
Year of birth missing (living people)